"The Blood of Carthage" is a story arc, based on the Buffy the Vampire Slayer television series, originally published in Buffy the Vampire Slayer #21–25 (May–September 2000) by Dark Horse Comics. The arc was later collected into a trade paperback.

Story description

General synopsis

Buffy has entered college but is having doubts as to whether education is needed for a vampire slayer. She becomes so concentrated on the issues, she makes a major mistake and kills the local version of Bigfoot. The death of this creature heralds the rise of a demon named Ky-Laag and potentially the end of the world. The Blood of Carthage, a powerful, secretive group, wishes to stop Ky-Laag, but unfortunately they also plan to kill Buffy as well for starting it all.

"The Blood of Carthage, part 1"

When the Scooby Gang hear of a new "boogeyman" legend, they track down a beast that seems to need slaying yet doing so turns out to be more trouble than it's worth.

"The Blood of Carthage, part 2"

Demons are gathering, as the group of undead grow in Sunnydale. Buffy and friends hope to discover why and then stop such events. Buffy also gets closer to working out the secrets of Vraka, Xerxes the Blind, and the remainder of the demon hordes. Yet she also has a term paper to do.

"The Blood of Carthage, part 3"

Buffy confronts the Blood of Carthage to find out who they are and what connection they have to the demon Vraka. Spike also seems to have a connection with the group. At the same time Buffy is considering leaving college.

"The Blood of Carthage, part 4"

Since the rise of the demon Ky-Laag is imminent, Buffy and her friends work with the Blood of Carthage, a cult of demons, in order to stop Ky-Laag from destroying Sunnydale and perhaps the world. However Buffy must discover why the Blood of Carthage want to stop a demon from rising, and why Spike is playing peacemaker between Buffy and Vraka.

"The Blood of Carthage, part 5"

Buffy learns of the history between the demons Vraka and Ky-Laag, and what it might mean for her friends. Buffy deals with the consequences of allying with the demon, Vraka, an explosive fight ensues at the center of Sunnydale.

Continuity
Supposed to be set early in Buffy season 4, whilst Buffy is still relatively new to College.
Also features flashbacks to the past friendship of Willow and Xander in 1987, 1989, and 1991.

Canonical issues

Buffy comics such as this one are not usually considered by fans as canonical. Some fans consider them stories from the imaginations of authors and artists, while other fans consider them as taking place in an alternative fictional reality. However unlike fan fiction, overviews summarising their story, written early in the writing process, were 'approved' by both Fox and Joss Whedon (or his office), and the books were therefore later published as officially Buffy merchandise.